Moricin is a highly basic antibacterial peptide that was isolated from the silkworm Bombyx mori. It consists of a long alpha-helix with 8 turns from a 42 amino acid sequence over almost the entire protein. The amphipathic N-terminal segment of the alpha- helix is mainly responsible for the increase in permeability of the bacterial membrane which kills the bacteria. Moricin functions as an antibacterial peptide against Gram-positive and Gram-negative bacteria, with its main activity being towards Gram-positive bacteria.

References

External links

Protein domains
Antimicrobial peptides
Insect immunity